Jasbinder Bilan is an Indian born British author and teacher.

Awards 

 Costa Book Award for Children's Book in 2019
 The Times/Chicken House Children’s Fiction Competition in 2017
 Finalist for Waterstones Children's Book Prize in Younger Fiction in 2020
 Longlisted for Jhalak Prize in 2020
 Her book Asha & the Spirit Bird was selected as "Children's book of the week" by The Times

References 

Children's writers
Year of birth missing (living people)
Living people